Lost Ships is an accessory for the Advanced Dungeons & Dragons fantasy role-playing game.

Contents
Lost Ships is a Spelljammer supplement which describes a region of space where derelict ships and strange creatures congregate.

Publication history
SJR1 Lost Ships was written by Ed Greenwood, with a cover by Brom, and was published by TSR in 1990 as a 96-page book.

Reception

Reviews

References

Role-playing game supplements introduced in 1990
Spelljammer supplements